Chionodes abitus is a moth in the family Gelechiidae. It is found in North America, where it has been recorded from California, Idaho, Montana, Nevada, Oregon, Washington, south-western Saskatchewan and southern British Columbia.

The larvae feed on Salix species, including Salix discolor.

References

Chionodes
Moths described in 1999
Moths of North America